Ali Peçen (born 30 January 1969 in İstanbul) is a Turkish volleyball player. He is 192 cm and plays as libero. Since the start of the 2007 season, he has played for Fenerbahçe Men's Volleyball Team and wears number 9. He is the team's vice-captain. He has also played for Eczacıbaşı, Halkbank, Netaş and Erdemir.

He has played over 180 times for the national team.

Achievements
 Turkish League Champion : 1989-90, 1990-91 
 Turkish League 2nd : 1986-87
 Turkish League 3rd : 1988-89
 Turkish League 4th : 1987-88,
 Turkish Cup Champion : 1989-90, 1990–91
 Turkish Presidents Cup Champion : 1990-91

References

1969 births
Living people
Volleyball players from Istanbul
Turkish men's volleyball players
Fenerbahçe volleyballers
Eczacıbaşı volleyball players
Galatasaray S.K. (men's volleyball) players